Yaqub Ali Kandi (also Romanized as Ya‘qūb ‘Alī Kandī and Ya‘qūb‘alī Kandī) is a village in Chaybasar-e Jonubi Rural District, in the Central District of Maku County, West Azerbaijan Province, Iran. 367 people, in 58 families, were living there as of the 2006 Census.

References 

Populated places in Maku County